The following is are two lists of football stadiums in Indonesia, ordered by capacity. Stadiums with a capacity of 5,000 or more are included.

Indonesia below 30,000 capacity stadiums

Under construction
The following list is a list of stadiums in Indonesia which are currently under construction and will have a capacity of 30,000 or more.

See also
List of Asian stadiums by capacity

References

 
Indonesia
Stadiums
Football venues in Indonesia
Football stadiums